Hans Holten (1892 – 1973) was a Norwegian newspaper editor.

He was born in Surnadal, took education as an agronomist but became a journalist by occupation. From 1933 to 1940 he led the press office of the Agrarian Party, at the same time being secretary general. From 1945 to 1963 he was the editor-in-chief of Nationen. He was also a member of the Norwegian Language Council, representing Bokmål writers.

References

1892 births
1973 deaths
Centre Party (Norway) politicians
Norwegian newspaper editors
People from Møre og Romsdal
People from Surnadal